Jake Hager may refer to:
 Jake Hager (born 1982), American professional wrestler
 Jake Hager (baseball) (born 1993), American professional baseball infielder